"It's Madness" was the second posthumous record released by American soul singer Marvin Gaye, released off his Dream Of A Lifetime album, in 1985.

The second posthumous release following up the successful hit, "Sanctified Lady", which missed a chance of giving Gaye his fourteenth number-one R&B single; "It's Madness" was brought out from old Motown archives from the early-'70s.

The song's melancholy vibe was reminiscent of Marvin's recordings during the 1970s and could have likely have been recorded as a demo for Sammy Davis, Jr., who briefly signed with the label (Gaye had also wanted to give Davis the song "Dream of a Lifetime" though he was unable to).

Written by Marvin and produced with an eighties pop flourish by his longtime mentor Harvey Fuqua, the song was released and peaked at number fifty-five on the R&B singles chart. It has since been issued on later compilations released of Marvin's music from his later years.

Credits
All vocals by Marvin Gaye
Written by Marvin Gaye
Produced by Harvey Fuqua

1985 singles
Marvin Gaye songs
Songs written by Marvin Gaye
Songs released posthumously
Song recordings produced by Harvey Fuqua
1985 songs
CBS Records singles